Pankajavalli is a 1947 Indian Tamil-language film written, produced and directed by S. Soundararajan. The music was by Papanasam Sivan. The film starred P. U. Chinnappa, T. R. Rajakumari and Kumari Rukmani. The film was basically the story of Alli, who dominates men in her kingdom and treats them like slaves. The film was inspired by the popular Kerala folktale Malayala Pankajavalli, which Ayyangar adapted.

Plot 
Arjuna decides to conquer Pankajavalli. However, she captures him. He prays to Krishna, who turns him into a woman named Brihannala. After many incidents, the truth comes out and everything ends happily.

Cast 
 P. U. Chinnappa as Arjuna
 T. R. Rajakumari as Pankajavalli
 Kumari Rukmaini as Krishna

Production 
The role of Krishna was played by a woman, at a time when women portray male figures was unusual.

Soundtrack 
The film's music was composed and lyrics by Papanasam Sivan. His assistant and P. U. Chinnappa sat together. Chinnappa apparently felt that Papanasam Sivan favoured M. K. Thyagaraja Bhagavathar. So during the session, he expressed this to Sivan, who smiled and told him that while Bhagavathar had a high pitched voice conducive for songs such as Manmadaleelaiyai (from Haridas) Chinnappa had a low-pitched voice. After, this Sivan wrote the opening line of the first song of the film – a prayer song in Ragha Karaha Priya. Sivan also sang the song Nee Illamal Anuvum Asaiyumo.

References 

1947 films
1940s Tamil-language films
Indian black-and-white films
Hindu mythological films
Films scored by Papanasam Sivan
Indian feminist films
Films based on Indian folklore